Gregory Howard Woods III (born April 1969) is an American judge and lawyer. In 2013, he became a United States district judge of the United States District Court for the Southern District of New York.

Early life and education
Woods was born in April 1969, in Lewes, Delaware, and grew up in Philadelphia, Pennsylvania. He received a Bachelor of Arts degree, magna cum laude, in 1991, from Williams College, located in Williamstown, Massachusetts. He received his Juris Doctor in 1995 from Yale Law School.

Career
He worked as a trial attorney in the Civil Division of the U.S. Department of Justice from 1995 to 1998. From 1998 to 2009, he worked at the law firm of Debevoise & Plimpton in New York City, New York, becoming partner in 2004. From 2009 to 2012, he served as Deputy General Counsel at the U.S. Department of Transportation. In 2012, he was confirmed by the U.S. Senate to serve as General Counsel of the U.S. Department of Energy, which he held until his appointment to the bench.

Federal judicial service
On May 9, 2013, on the recommendation of Senator Chuck Schumer, President Barack Obama nominated Woods to serve as a U.S. District Judge of the United States District Court for the Southern District of New York, to the seat vacated by Judge Barbara S. Jones, who took senior status on December 31, 2012. The Senate Judiciary Committee reported his nomination to the full senate by voice vote on August 1, 2013. On November 4, 2013, the full senate voted to confirm Woods in a voice vote. He received his commission on November 18, 2013.

See also 
 List of African-American federal judges
 List of African-American jurists

References

External links

1969 births
Living people
20th-century American lawyers
21st-century American lawyers
African-American judges
African-American lawyers
American law firm executives
Judges of the United States District Court for the Southern District of New York
People from Lewes, Delaware
People from Manhattan
United States district court judges appointed by Barack Obama
21st-century American judges
United States Department of Energy officials
United States Department of Justice lawyers
United States Department of Transportation officials
Williams College alumni
Yale Law School alumni
Date of birth missing (living people)
People associated with Debevoise & Plimpton